Karatavia is a genus of flowering plants belonging to the family Apiaceae. It has only one species, Karatavia kultiassovii, native to Kazakhstan.

References

Apioideae